The International Centre for Diffraction Data (ICDD) maintains a database of powder diffraction patterns, the Powder Diffraction File (PDF), including the d-spacings (related to angle of diffraction) and relative intensities of observable diffraction peaks.  Patterns may be experimentally determined, or computed based on crystal structure and Bragg's law.  It is most often used to identify substances based on x-ray diffraction data, and is designed for use with a diffractometer. The PDF contains more than a million unique material data sets. Each data set contains diffraction, crystallographic and bibliographic data, as well as experimental, instrument and sampling conditions, and select physical properties in a common standardized format.

The organization was founded in 1941 as the  Joint Committee on Powder Diffraction Standards (JCPDS). In 1978, the name of the organization was changed to the current name to highlight the global commitment of this scientific endeavor.

The ICDD is a nonprofit scientific organization working in the field of X-ray analysis and materials characterization. The ICDD produces materials databases, characterization tools, and educational materials, as well as organizing and supporting global workshops, clinics and conferences.

Products and services of the ICDD include the paid subscription based Powder Diffraction File databases (PDF-2, PDF-4+, PDF-4+/Web , PDF-4/Minerals, PDF-4/Organics, PDF-4/Axiom, and ICDD Server Edition), educational workshops, clinics, and symposia. The ICDD is a sponsor of the Denver X-ray Conference (DXC) and the Pharmaceutical Powder X-ray Diffraction Symposium (PPXRD). The ICDD also publishes the journals Advances in X-ray Analysis and Powder Diffraction.

In 2019, Materials Data, also known as MDI, merged with ICDD. Materials Data creates JADE software used to collect, analyze, and simulate XRD data and solve issues in an array of materials science projects.

In 2020, the ICDD and the Cambridge Crystallographic Data Centre (CCDC) announced a data partnership. The CCDC curates and maintains the Cambridge Structural Database (CSD).

See also
Powder diffraction
Crystallography

External links
 
 History, contents & use of the PDF
 Materials Data
 Advances in X-ray Analysis—Technical articles on x-ray methods and analyses
 Powder Diffraction Journal—quarterly journal published by the JCPDS-International Centre for Diffraction Data through the Cambridge University Press
 Denver X-ray Conference—World's largest X-ray conference on the latest advancements in XRD and XRF
 PPXRD-16 —Pharmaceutical Powder X-ray Diffraction Symposium

Crystallography organizations
Diffraction
Optics institutions
Organizations established in 1941